Antti Tulenheimo's cabinet was the Government of Finland from March 31, 1925 to December 31, 1925. It was formed between the National Coalition Party and the Agrarian Party, and had four ministers from the National Coalition Party, five from the Agrarian Party and four neutral. The cabinet lasted 276 days in office. The cabinet resigned after its proposal for defense spending was defeated in the parliament.

References

Tulenheimo
1925 establishments in Finland
1925 disestablishments in Finland
Cabinets established in 1925
Cabinets disestablished in 1925